Monson was a town located in Hillsborough County, New Hampshire. Monson became abandoned in 1770 due to the poor soil on the lands and the limited resources it had at the time. The land that was Monson is now parts of the towns of Hollis, Milford, Amherst, and Brookline.

See also
 List of ghost towns in New Hampshire

References

Former populated places in New Hampshire
Ghost towns in New Hampshire
Hillsborough County, New Hampshire